Kaattumallika is a 1966 Indian Malayalam-language film, directed and produced by P. Subramaniam. The film stars Vaikkam Mani, Kalpana, Babu Joseph and C. L. Anandan. The film had musical score by M. S. Baburaj. Kattumallika is essentially a remake of the 1941 Tamil film Vana Mohini.

Cast 
Vaikkam Mani
Kalpana
Babu Joseph
C. L. Anandan
Geethanjali
Natarajan
Paravoor Bharathan
Rajamma
S. P. Pillai
K. V. Shanthi

Soundtrack 
The music was composed by M. S. Baburaj and the lyrics were written by Sreekumaran Thampi. This was Thampi's first film.

References

External links 
 

1966 films
1960s Malayalam-language films
Films directed by P. Subramaniam